Hunnesrück Castle was a hilltop castle built in the 13th century. Its ruins are located in the Amtsberge hills near Dassel in the district of Northeim in south Lower Saxony in Germany.

The castle was constructed in the 13th century and destroyed in 1521 during the Hildesheim Diocesan Feud. Only parts of the moats, walls and ramparts remain.

References

External links 
 Chronology at www.stadt-dassel.de
 Artist's impression of the castle in the Middle Ages

Castles in Lower Saxony
Dassel
Buildings and structures in Northeim (district)